See Amenemhat, for other individuals with this name.

Amenemhat III (Ancient Egyptian: Ỉmn-m-hꜣt meaning 'Amun is at the forefront'), also known as Amenemhet III, was a pharaoh of ancient Egypt and the sixth king of the Twelfth Dynasty of the Middle Kingdom. He was elevated to throne as co-regent by his father Senusret III, with whom he shared the throne as the active king for twenty years. During his reign, Egypt attained its cultural and economic zenith of the Middle Kingdom.

The aggressive military and domestic policies of Senusret III, which re-subjugated Nubia and wrested power from the nomarchs, allowed Amenemhat III to inherit a stable and peaceful Egypt. He directed his efforts towards an extensive building program with particular focus on Faiyum. Here he dedicated a temple to Sobek, a chapel to Renenutet, erected two colossal statues of himself in Biahmu, and contributed to excavation of Lake Moeris. He built for himself two pyramids at Dahshur and Hawara, becoming the first pharaoh since Sneferu in the Fourth Dynasty to build more than one. Near to his Hawara pyramid is a pyramid for his daughter Neferuptah. To acquire resources for the building program, Amenemhat III exploited the quarries of Egypt and the Sinai for turquoise and copper. Other exploited sites includes the schist quarries at Wadi Hammamat, amethyst from Wadi el-Hudi, fine limestone from Tura, alabaster from Hatnub, red granite from Aswan, and diorite from Nubia. A large corpus of inscriptions attest to the activities at these sites, particularly at Serabit el-Khadim. There is scant evidence of military expeditions during his reign, though a small one is attested at Kumma in his ninth regnal year. He also sent a handful of expeditions to Punt.

In total, Amenemhat III reigned for at least 45 years, though a papyrus mentioning a 46th year likely belongs to his reign as well. Toward the end of his reign he instituted a co-regency with Amenemhat IV, as recorded in a rock inscription from Semna in Nubia, which equates regnal year 1 of Amenemhat IV to regnal year 44 or 46–48 of Amenemhat III. Sobekneferu later succeeded Amenemhat IV as the last ruler of the Twelfth Dynasty.

Sources

Contemporaneous sources 
There are a variety of contemporary sources attesting to the reign of Amenemhat III. Chief among these are the collection of inscriptions left at mining sites throughout Egypt, Nubia, and the Sinai peninsula. His activities in the Sinai are particularly well attested to, spanning regnal years 2 to 45. It is notable though, that the overwhelming majority of these inscriptions originate outside Egypt. He is also well attested to through his statuary with approximately 80 works attributed to him, his building program, particularly concentrated around Faiyum, and the two pyramids that he had built. The Rhind Mathematical Papyrus – one of a limited set of evidence attesting to Egyptian knowledge of mathematics – is also thought to have been originally composed during Amenemhat III's time.

Historical sources 
The Karnak king list from the Festival Hall of Thutmose III (c. 1479–1425 BC) has a lacuna of two entries between Amenemhat II and Amenemhat IV, though three kings are known to have reigned during this period – Senusret II, Senusret III, and Amenemhat III. In the Abydos king list from the temple of Seti I (c. 1290–1279 BC) in Abydos, Amenemhat III is attested by his praenomen Ni-maat-re in the sixty-fourth entry. His praenomen also occupies the sixty-fourth entry in the king list at the temple of Ramesses II (c. 1279–1213 BC) in Abydos. In the Saqqara Tablet from the tomb of the chief lector priest and chief of works Tjuneroy, Amenemhat III's praenomen occupies the twentieth entry. The Turin Canon has a lacuna in the mid-Twelfth Dynasty preserving no names and only partial reign lengths. The twenty-fifth entry of the fifth column corresponding to Amenemhat III preserves only a regnal length of 40+x years. The entries of his presumed children and immediate successors – Amenemhat IV and Sobekneferu – are near-wholly intact preserving their praenomen and reign lengths. 

Amenemhat III is also mentioned in Manetho's Aegyptiaca, originally composed circa the 3rd century BC, tentatively dated to the reign of Ptolemy II. The original work is no longer extant, but has persisted through the writings of Josephus, Africanus, Eusebius, and Syncellus. He is accorded a reign of 8 years under the name Λαχάρης (romanized Lacharês / Lamarês) by both Africanus and Eusebius. Syncellus accords him a reign of 43 years under the name Μάρης (romanized Marês) as the thirty-fifth king of Thebes.

Family 

Amenemhat III was the son of Senusret III, his predecessor on the throne. There is no explicit testimony to this filial relationship, however, the inference can be made from their co-regency. The identity of his mother is unknown. He had several sisters – Menet, Mereret, Senetsenbetes, Sithathor, and a partially known Khnemet-. 

Two of Amenemhat III's wives are known, Aat and Khenemetneferhedjet III, who were both buried in his Pyramid at Dahshur. Hetepti – the mother of Amenemhat IV – might be another wife. He had one confirmed daughter, Neferuptah, who appears to have been groomed as his successor, owing to her name being enclosed in cartouche. The Egyptologists Aidan Dodson and Dyan Hilton indicate that Neferuptah was originally buried at Amenemhat III's second pyramid at Hawara but was eventually moved to her own pyramid after an early death. The Egyptologist Wolfram Grajetzki contradicts this stating that she was never buried in Hawara, but had possibly outlived her father and was buried elsewhere as a result. Two other children, both of whom reigned as king, are also attributed to Amenemhat III: a son, Amenemhat IV and a daughter, Sobekneferu. It has also been suggested that Amenemhat IV may instead have been a grandson. Evidence of burials of three other princesses – Hathorhotep, Nubhotep, and Sithathor – were found at the Dahshur complex, but it is not clear whether these princesses were Amenemhat III's daughters as the complex was used for royal burials throughout the Thirteenth Dynasty.

Reign

Chronology 
The relative chronology of rulers in the Twelfth Dynasty is considered settled. The Ramesside king lists and the Turin Canon are a significant source in determining the relative chronology of the rulers. The Turin Canon has a lacuna of four lines between Amenemhat I and Amenemhat IV, recording only partial regnal lengths for the four kings – 10+x, 19, 30+x, and 40+x years respectively. The king lists of Seti I and Ramesses II at Abydos and the Saqqara tablet each list Amenemhat III with Senusret III – whose praenomen is Kha-kau-re – as his predecessor and Amenemhat IV – whose praenomen is Maa-kheru-re – as his successor. Instead Egyptological debate has centred on the existence of co-regencies.

Co-regency 

In his twentieth regnal year, Senusret III elevated his son Amenemhat III to the status of co-regent. The co-regency seems to be established from several indicators, though not all scholars agree and some instead argue for sole reigns for both kings. For the following twenty years, Senusret III and Amenemhat III shared the throne, with Amenemhat III taking the active role as king. It is assumed that Amenemhat III took the primary role as the regnal dates roll over from year 19 of Senusret III to year 1 of Amenemhat III. His reign is attested for at least 45 years, though a papyrus fragment from El-Lahun mentioning 'regnal year 46, month 1 of akhet, day 22' likely dates to his rule as well. The highest date might be found on a bowl from Elephantine bearing regnal year 46, month three of peret. This attribution is favoured by the Egyptologist Cornelius von Pilgrim, but rejected by the Egyptologist Wolfram Grajetzki who places it in the early Middle Kingdom. In his 30th regnal year, the king celebrated his Sed festival as is mentioned in several inscriptions. His reign ends with a brief co-regency with his successor Amenemhat IV. This is evidenced from a rock inscription at Semna which equates regnal year 1 of Amenemhat IV with regnal year 44 or perhaps 46–48 of Amenemhat III.

These two kings – Senusret III and Amenemhat III – presided over the golden age of the Middle Kingdom. Senusret III had pursued aggressive military action to curb incursions from tribes people from Nubia. These campaigns were conducted across several years and were brutal against the native populations, including slaughter of men, enslavement of women and children, and the burning of fields. He also sent a military expedition into Syria-Palestine, enemies of Egypt since the reign of Senusret I. His internal policies targeted the increasing power of provincial governors, transferring power back to the reigning monarch. It is disputed whether he dismantled the nomarchical system. He also formed the basis for the legendary character Sesostris described by Manetho and Herodotus. As a consequence of Senusret III's administrative and military policies, Amenemhat III inherited a peaceful and stable Egypt, which reached its cultural and economic zenith under his direction.

Military campaigns 
There is very little evidence for military expeditions during Amenemhat III's reign. One rock inscription records a small mission in regnal year nine. It was found in Nubia, near the fortress of Kumma. The short text reports that a military mission was guided by the mouth of Nekhen Zamonth who states that he went north with a small troop and that there were no deaths on the return south. There is a stela dated to regnal 33 that was discovered at Kerma, south of the Third Cataract, discussing the construction of a wall, though this stela must have originated elsewhere as Kerma was beyond Egypt's control at this time.

Mining expeditions 

Exploitation of the quarries of Egypt and the Sinai for turquoise and copper peaked during his reign. A collection of more than 50 texts were inscribed at Serabit el-Khadim, Wadi Maghara, and Wadi Nasb. The efforts here were so extensive that near-permanent settlements formed around them. The quarries at Wadi Hammamat (schist), Wadi el-Hudi (amethyst), Tura (limestone), Hatnub (alabaster), Aswan (red granite) and throughout Nubia (diorite) were all also exploited. These all translated into an extensive building program, particularly in the development of Faiyum.

Sinai peninsula 
Amenemhat III's activities in the Sinai peninsula are well-attested. There were expeditions to Wadi Maghara in regnal years 2, 30, and 41–43, with one further expedition in an indiscernible 20 + x year. The temple of Hathor was decorated during the expedition in year 2, which is also the only expedition for which the mining of copper is attested. A related inscription found in Ayn Soukhna suggests that the mission originated from Memphis and perhaps crossed the Red Sea to the peninsula by boat. A single expedition in Wadi Nasb is attested to his 20th regnal year. Between 18 and 20 expeditions to Serabit el-Khadim have been attested to Amenemhat III's reign: in years 2, 4–8, 13, 15, 20, 23, 25, 27, 30, 38, 40, 44, possibly also 18, 29, and 45, alongside a 10 + x and x + 17 years, and there are many inscriptions whose date is indeterminable.

Egypt 
One inscription dating to year 43 of Amenemhat III's reign comes from Tura and refers to the quarrying of limestone there for a mortuary temple, either that at Dahshur or Hawara. The stela bears a partial date suggesting that it was inscribed after regnal year 10.

Several expeditions to Wadi Hammamat where schist was quarried were recorded. These date to regnal years 2, 3, 19, 20 and 33. The statues were destined for the Labyrinth at Hawara. A few expeditions were sent to Wadi el-Hudi, south-east of Aswan, at the southern border of Egypt, where amethyst was collected. These enterprises date to regnal years 1, 11, 20, and 28. An expedition was also sent to Wadi Abu Agag, near Aswan, in regnal year 13.

Nubia 
North-west of Abu Simbel and west of Lake Nasser lie the quarries of Gebel el-Asr in Lower Nubia. The site is best known as the source of diorite for six of Khafre's seated statues. The locale was also a source of gneiss and chalcedony in the Middle Kingdom. The Chalcedony deposits are also known as 'stela ridge' as it was a place where commemorative stelae and votive offerings were left. Nine of these commemorative objects date to the reign of Amenemhat III, specifically regnal years 2 and 4.

Trade expeditions 
A stela was discovered at Mersa on the Red Sea coast, by Rosanna Pirelli in 2005 that detailed an expedition to Punt during the reign of Amenemhat III. The expedition was organized by chief steward Senbef. Under his direction, two contingents were formed. The first was led by an Amenhotep and bound for Punt to acquire incense. The second led by a Nebesu was sent to the mines referred to as Bia-Punt to procure exotic metals. There were a total of between two and five expeditions organized during Amenemhat III's rule. Two of the stelae recovered from the site are dated indicating activity there in his 23rd and 41st regnal years.

Building program 
Amenemhat III's building program included monuments in Khatana, Tell el-Yahudiyya, and Bubastis. At Bubastis, Amenemhat III likely built a palace which hosts relief art containing his name. Of note is a relief that depicts Amenemhat III officiating his sed-festival. Further works include the enlargement of the temples to Hathor at Serabit el-Khadim and Ptah in Memphis, the construction of a temple in Quban, and the reinforcement of fortresses at Semna. At Elephantine a fragment of stela bearing a building inscription was found dated to his regnal year 44. A very similar inscription from possibly the same year was found at Elkab, which indicates the extension of a defensive wall built by Senusret II. Another find at Elephantine was a door lintel of the Eleventh Dynasty, where Amenemhat III added an inscription dated to his regnal year 34. Inscriptions with the king's name have also been uncovered at Lisht, Memphis, and Heracleopolis and statues of the king were found in Thebes. No site, however, received as much attention as Faiyum, with which Amenemhat III is most closely associated.

In Faiyum, Amenemhat built a huge temple dedicated to Sobek at Kiman Faras. He dedicated a chapel to Renenutet at Medinet Madi. This small temple with three chapels is the best preserved of his temple works. It was built toward the end of his reign and completed by his successor, Amenemhat IV. These face Lake Moeris, for which he is credited with excavating, although how much of this work was conducted by Amenemhat III is unknown. The work on Lake Moeris had been inaugurated by Senusret II to link the Faiyum Depression with Bahr Yussef. This project reclaimed land downstream at the edges of Lake Moeris allowing it to be farmed. It is known as Mer-Wer or the Great Canal. The area continued to be used until 230 BC when the Lahun branch of the Nile silted up. Amenemhat III kept close watch on the inundation levels of the Nile, as demonstrated by inscriptions left at Kumma and Semna. The most enduring of his works are the two pyramids that he built for himself, the first king since Sneferu in the Fourth Dynasty to build more than one. His pyramids are in Dahshur and Hawara.

Pyramids

Dahshur 

The construction of the pyramid at Dahshur, the 'Black Pyramid' (Egyptian language: Sḫm Ỉmn-m-hꜣt meaning 'Amenemhat is Mighty' or Nfr Ỉmn-m-hꜣt meaning 'Amenemhat is Beautiful'/'Perfect One of Amenemhat') began in the first year of Amenemhat III's reign. The pyramid core was constructed entirely of mudbrick and stabilized through the building of a stepped core rather than with a stone framework. This now resides in the Egyptian Museum in Cairo, catalogued as JE 35133. The pyramidion had a band of hieroglyphic text running on all four of its sides. That the name of Amun has been erased on the pyramidion can only be the result of Akhenaten's proscription against the god. 

In front of the pyramid, lay a mortuary temple of simple design comprising an offering hall and an open columned courtyard. Surrounding the complex were two mudbrick enclosing walls. From the mortuary temple an open, mudbrick walled causeway led to the valley temple. Beneath the pyramid was built a substructure with an intricate series of passages and chambers, with burial chambers for the king and two queens. The two queens, Aat and an unidentified queen, were buried here and their remains were recovered from their chambers. The king, though, was not buried here. Shortly after the completion of the pyramid superstructure, in around Amenemhat III's 15th regnal year, the substructure began to buckle with cracks appearing inside as a result of groundwater seepage. Rushed efforts were made to prevent the structure collapsing, which were successful, but just as Sneferu had decided to do with his Bent Pyramid, Amenemhat III chose to build a new one.

Hawara 

The second pyramid is at Hawara (Egyptian language: Uncertain, possibly ꜥnḫ Ỉmn-m-hꜣt 'Amenemhat Lives'), in the Faiyum Oasis. This pyramid project was begun around Amenemhat III's 15th regnal year, after problems with the Dahshur pyramid persisted. The choice of Hawara suggests that the cultivation of Faiyum was complete and that Amenemhat III was diverting resources to that area. The pyramid had a core constructed entirely of mudbrick encased in fine white Tura limestone. The shallower inclination angle was a step taken to guard against the threat of a collapse and avoid a repeat of the failure at Dahshur. Inside the substructure, builders took further precautions, such as lining chamber pits with limestone.

Before the pyramid lay a mortuary temple, that has been identified as 'the Labyrinth' which Classical travellers such as Herodotus and Strabo referred to and which formed the basis for the 'Labyrinth of Minos'. The temple was destroyed in antiquity and can only be partially reconstructed. Its floorplan covered an estimated . According to Strabo's account, the temple contained as many rooms as there were nomes in Egypt, while Herodotus wrote about being led 'from courtyards into rooms, rooms into galleries, galleries into more rooms, thence into more courtyards'. A limestone statue of Sobek and another of Hathor were discovered here as were two granite shrines each containing two statues of Amenemhat III. The causeway has been identified near the south-west corner of the complex, but neither it nor the valley temple have been investigated.

Neferuptah 
It was excavated by Nagib Farag and Zaky Iskander in 1956. The superstructure of the pyramid is near completely lost and the substructure was found full of groundwater, but her burial was otherwise undisturbed including both her sarcophagus and funerary equipment.

Sculpture 
Amenemhat III and Sensuret III are the best attested rulers of the Middle Kingdom by number of statues, with about 80 statues that can be assigned to the former. The sculpture of Amenemhat III continued the tradition of Senusret III, though it pursued a more natural and expressive physiognomy, while retaining an idealized image. A wide range of stones were used for the sculpture of the king, include white limestone, obsidian, chalcedony and copper alloy. Furthermore, the king introduced new and re-interpreted types of sculptures, many of which were inspired by far older works. Two broad facial types can be assigned to Amenemhat III. An expressive style in which the face of the king has its musculature, bone structure, and furrows clearly marked. This style is evidently inspired by the sculpture of Senusret III. A humanized style in which the face is simplified with few or no folds or furrows and averse to sharp transitions between features. These have a generally softer, more youthful expression.

Officials 
The vizier Kheti (H̱ty) held office around year 29 of Amenemhat III's reign, as is attested on a papyrus from el-Lahun. The papyrus is a business document authored by the vizier in his office discussing payment of two brothers named Ahy-seneb (Ỉhy-snb) for their services. At that time one brother, Ahy-seneb Ankh-ren (ꜥnḫ-rn), was an 'assistant to the treasurer', yet on a later papyrus containing his will, dated to year 44 of Amenemhat III's reign, he had become the 'director of works'. This latter papyrus contains two dates: year 44, month II of Shemu, day 13 and year 2, month II of Akhet, day 18. The latter date refers to the reign of either Amenemhat IV or Sobekneferu. There is one other hieratic text and also a limestone table on which Ahy-seneb Ankh-ren is attested. The other brother, Ahy-seneb Wah (Wꜣḥ), was a wab-priest and 'superintendent of priestly orders of Sepdu, lord of the East'.

A further vizier datable to the reign was Ameny (Ỉmny). Ameny is attested on two rock inscriptions from Aswan. The first found by Flinders Petrie on the road between Philae and Aswan, and the second found by Jacques de Morgan on the right bank of the river nile between Bar and Aswan. The inscriptions bear the names of his family members, including his wife Sehotepibre Nehy (Sḥtp-ỉb-rꜥ Nḥy) who is also attested on a stela in Copenhagen National Museum.

Khnumhotep (H̱nmw-ḥtp) was an official that held office for at least three decades from Senusret II's first regnal year through to Amenemhat III's reign. At the beginning of Senusret II's reign he was a chamberlain, but by the end of his life he held both the office of vizier and chief steward. His tomb in Dahshur also attests to many other titles including 'high official', 'royal seal-bearer', 'chief lector-priest', 'master of secrets', and 'overseer of the city'.

The treasurer Ikhernofret (Y-ẖr-nfrt) was still in office in the early years of the king's reign, as is demonstrated by a funerary stela in the Egyptian Museum in Cairo. This official is among the best attested for the Middle Kingdom, though there is little known of his family. His funerary stela is dated to Amenemhat III's first regnal year and bears his name along with three of his titles: 'sealbearer of the King of Lower Egypt', 'sole friend of the king', and 'treasurer'. The treasurer is mentioned on the funerary stela of an Ameny (Ỉmny) 'chief of staff of the bureau of the vizier'. The latter part of the stela tells of the attendance of Ikhernofret and Sasetet (Sꜣ-sṯt) at a feast in Abydos at the instruction of Senusret III after a campaign against Nubia in his regnal year 19. Ameny is also mentioned on the 'stela of Sasetet' dating to the first year of Amenemhat III, where he still held the same position. Sasetet holds the title 'chief of staff of the bureau of the treasurer' in that stela. 

Another treasurer under Amenemhat III is Senusretankh (S-n-wsrt-ꜥnḫ), who is known from his recently uncovered mastaba at Dahshur, near the pyramid of Senusret III. The surviving fragments of a red granite offering table recovered from the tomb bear the birth and throne names of Amenemhat III. The table further bears numerous other epithets and titles with which the owner connects himself to the king.

Another chief steward, Senbef (Snb=f) is known from an expedition stela found at Mersa and from a papyrus document. The stela contains an image of Amenemhat III presenting offerings to the god Min. Behind the king stands another official, Nebsu (Nbsw) the 'Overseer of the Cabinet of the Head of the South', effectively meaning that he was the head of a workforce. Beneath the image are inscriptions recording two expeditions to Punt alongside the names of the expedition leaders. The leads of the two expeditions are Nebsu himself and his brother Amenhotep (Ỉmn-htp), holding the title of 'scribe in charge of the seal of the treasury'.

See also 
 List of pharaohs

Notes

References

Bibliography

External links 

Amenemhat (III) Nimaatre
The Pyramid of Amenemhet III from Talking Pyramids

 
19th-century BC deaths
19th-century BC Pharaohs
Pharaohs of the Twelfth Dynasty of Egypt
Year of birth unknown
Senusret III